Por Larrañaga (meaning by Larrañaga) is the name of a cigar brand produced in Cuba for Habanos S.A., the Cuban state-owned tobacco company, as well as a non-Cuban line of cigars produced in the Dominican Republic and Honduras for Altadis, a subsidiary of Imperial Brands.  Por Larrañaga cigars have been in continuous production in Cuba since 1834, longer than any other Cuban cigar brand.

History

Cuba Production
Por Larrañaga was registered in 1834 by Ignacio Larrañaga, a Spanish immigrant who came to Havana in 1825. Larrañaga established his first factory at 58 San Miguel Street in the city. By the end of the 19th century, Por Larrañaga had become a well-known premium cigar brand producing both expensive and inexpensive cigars. In 1920, the company purchased a larger factory building for $100,000 on Carlos Tercero (Carlos III) Street in Havana.

In 1925, after years of labor interruptions and labor shortages Por Larrañaga became the first factory to make machine-made cigars, after importing new rolling and wrapping machines from the USA.   The new technology could use high quality Cuban leaf and produce a cigar with an acceptable draw for only about 25% of the cost of a hand-rolled cigar, and a machine operator could be trained in two weeks as opposed to the years of training required to acquire the skill needed to rapidly hand-roll a cigar. Por Larrañaga's decision to introduce automated cigar making on the island resulted in strikes and a boycott by factory cigar-rollers, and Por Larrañaga was forced to return the machines to the seller.

In 1960, the Cuban revolutionary government nationalized all cigar companies including Por Larrañaga.  At the time of the revolution, Por Larrañaga was the sixth largest producing Cuban brand.  Production was moved from the building on Carlos III Street in Havana to the La Corona factory at Avenida 20 de Mayo.

Up until the 1970s, Por Larrañaga remained a respectable and popular premium cigar brand.  In the 1980s production fell dramatically and due to trademark litigation in the 1990s, export of the brand was reduced to only a few countries.  For some time the brand was reduced to almost entirely machine-made or hand-finished and was mainly sold in Canada and the Middle East. Since 2002, all vitolas are totally hand-made, using either long-filler or short-filler leaf sourced from the Vuelta Abajo.

In 2006, Habanos produced a few thousand boxes of Por Larrañaga Lonsdales (a discontinued vitola much mourned by aficionados of the brand) for release in Germany.  The cigars were packaged in 25-count dress boxes and marked with a special second band that read "Exclusivo Alemania" (Germany Exclusive).

Cigar Aficionado's December 2006 issue reviewed its first Por Larrañaga outside of its "Connoisseur's Corner".  The petit corona selected scored 91 of 100 on the CA rating scale.

Non-Cuban Production
Rights to the brand in the United States were acquired by Altadis U.S.A.  In 2016, the company announced it would be manufacturing a new line of non-Cuban cigars under the Por Larrañaga label.

Vitolas in the Por Larrañaga Line

The following list of vitolas de salida (commercial vitolas) within the Por Larrañaga marque lists their size and ring gauge in Imperial (and Metric), their vitolas de galera (factory vitolas), and their common name in American cigar slang.

Hand-Made Vitolas
 Montecarlo - 6" × 33 (159 × 13.10 mm), Delicioso, a slim panetela
 Panetela - 5" × 36 (127 × 14.29 mm), Veguerito, a short panetela using short-filler leaf
 Petit Corona - 5" × 42 (130 × 16.67 mm), Mareva, a petit corona
Edición Regional Releases
 Lonsdale (Germany 2006) - 6" × 42 (165 × 16.67 mm), Cervantes, a lonsdale
 Robusto de Larrañaga (Asia Pacific 2007) - 4" × 50 (124 × 19.84 mm), Robusto, a robusto or rothschild
 Magnifico (United Kingdom 2007, 2008) - 6" × 50 (171 × 19.84 mm), Partagás No. 16, a double robusto
 Belicoso Extra (Asia Pacific 2008) - 5" × 52 (140 × 20.64 mm), Campana, a belicoso
 Los Andes (Peru 2009) - 5" × 50 (127 × 19.84 mm) Petit Pirámide, a petit pyramid
 Valioso (Switzerland 2009) - 6" × 52 (156 × 20.64 mm) Pirámide, a pyramid or torpedo
 Robustos (Germany 2010) - 4" x 50 (124 x 19.84 mm) Robusto, a robusto or rothschild
 Encantos (Asia Pacific 2010) - 6" x 43 (170 x 17.07 mm) Dalias, a lonsdale
 Opera (France 2015) - 4" x 52 (115 x 20.64 mm) Petit Robusto*
 5000 limited edition numbered boxes of ten

UK Regional Specialities Release of Por Larranaga Magnificos

Launched by Hunters & Frankau on 1 November the Por Larranaga Magnificos is a Habanos Regional Speciality exclusively for sale in the UK (English Market Selection). Coming in at 6" by 50 ring gauge it was rolled to reproduce the size and flavour of the 1970s Por Larranaga Magnum.

Only 1400 limited edition numbered boxes were made with 1000 tens and 400 boxes of twenty-five.

See also 
 Cigar brands
 Cuban cigars

References

 Nee, Min Ron - An Illustrated Encyclopaedia of Post-Revolution Havana Cigars (2003, Reprinted: 2005), 
 http://www.cubancigarwebsite.com/brand.aspx?brand=Por_Larranaga

External links
 Por Larrañaga on Habanos.com
 Por Larrañaga on Altadis USA

Habanos S.A. brands
Imperial Brands brands
Cuban brands